The SuperLiga was an official North American association football competition between teams from the Liga MX of Mexico and Major League Soccer of the United States and Canada, the top divisions in each country. The competition was sanctioned by CONCACAF, U.S. Soccer, the Canadian Soccer Association and Federación Mexicana de Fútbol and served as the sub-regional championship for the North American section of CONCACAF, much like its Central American and Caribbean counterparts, the Copa Interclubes UNCAF and CFU Club Championship respectively. The tournament was first held in 2007 and was cancelled in March 2011.

Format 

The format consisted of a group stage, followed by playoffs or "knockout" rounds, with all games held at MLS sites. The tournament had an invitational format for its 2007 debut, with four teams invited from both MLS and the Primera División. For successive tournaments, MLS announced that "the four MLS teams with the best regular season records in 2007 will qualify for SuperLiga 2008". However, after problems of fixture congestion during the 2008 season, Major League Soccer announced that starting with SuperLiga 2009 it would no longer allow teams to compete in both the CONCACAF Champions League and the SuperLiga, so the criteria for MLS teams was amended to the top four teams not already qualified for the Champions League. For the Primera División, the champions of the last 4 semi-annual tournaments earned berths to SuperLiga.

The tournament was discontinued after the 2010 edition, with MLS commissioner Don Garber stating that “SuperLiga was a great tournament which served its purpose during its time. CONCACAF got more and more committed to a continental tournament with the Champions League, which we’re very supportive of. It has delivered the value we intended in SuperLiga to put our teams against the best competition in this region.”

A new inter-league competition, the Leagues Cup, was established by MLS and Liga MX in 2019.

Television 
The tournament was telecast live by Univision's TeleFutura network in the United States and by Televisa and TV Azteca in Mexico. It could also be seen in English on Fox Sports World Canada, MLS Soccer, and SuperLiga2010.com, which all shared the same feed. The tournament was also streamed live at UnivisionFutbol.com.

Finals

Performances

By club

By country

See also 
 Campeones Cup
 Leagues Cup
 UEFA Europa League

References

External links

 SuperLiga Official Site
 SuperLiga Regulations

 
International club association football competitions hosted by the United States
International club association football competitions in North America
Defunct CONCACAF club competitions
Recurring sporting events established in 2007
Recurring events disestablished in 2010
2007 establishments in North America
2010 disestablishments in North America